A Head Full of Ghosts is the fourth  horror novel by American writer  Paul G. Tremblay.  The plot involves an American family from Massachusetts under financial and emotional strain when their fourteen-year-old daughter, Marjorie Barrett, exhibits signs of severe mental illness.  The story is told from the point of view of Marjorie's eight-year-old sister, Meredith "Merry" Barrett. However, the point of view also has another layer, as Merry's story is told in flashbacks. She is a 23-year-old now and is telling her story to a writer named Rachel Neville. Themes include elements of Catholic exorcism and reality television exploitation. Several reviewers noted plot and thematic similarities to Shirley Jackson's "We Have Always Lived In The Castle" as well as the same name of the protagonists. Tremblay dedicated the novel to Jackson.

The novel was published on June 2, 2015 by William Morrow and won the Horror Writers Association's Bram Stoker Award for Novel in 2015.  Focus Features has acquired the rights to develop a movie adaptation.

Synopsis 
The book is told from the perspective of Meredith "Merry" Barrett, a 23-year-old who is finally ready to share details of the horrific incidents that occurred when she was eight years old. Merry tells this story to a writer named Rachel Neville. These flashbacks are what serve as the narrative going forward in the novel, with a few chapters that show Merry and Rachel in the present. There are also a few chapters containing posts from a blog called "The Last Final Girl." This blog, which is written by a girl named Karen, is diving into a deconstruction of the reality TV show that Merry and her family starred in called The Possession. It is later revealed that Karen is actually a pseudonym. 

As we follow Merry as a precocious 8-year-old, we see that her home life is strained. Her father, John, is unemployed, leaving her mother, Sarah, to serve as the home's sole breadwinner while their savings account is slowly drained of resources. To make matters worse, Merry's sister Marjorie has been acting in an increasingly bizarre fashion, blurring the lines between schizophrenia and full-blown demonic possession. This particularly comes to Merry's attention after her sister begins telling her strange and macabre stories instead of innocent ones based on characters from Richard Scarry's Cars and Trucks and Things That Go. Unbeknownst to Merry, Marjorie has been seeing a therapist, something she only learns after Marjorie experiences a particularly bad episode. 

Things continue to go downhill until Merry's father, who had recently become a born again Catholic, decides that Marjorie is possessed by a demon and enlists the help of his church's priest, Father Wanderly, who believes an exorcism is necessary. Meanwhile, John agrees to have Marjorie become the focus of a reality TV show called The Possession. A TV crew, including director/producer Barry Cotton and head writer Ken Fletcher, move into the Barrett's home and start documenting their every move. 

The show only manages to tear the family further apart, and during this time, Marjorie tells Merry that she has been faking her signs of demonic possession. She chose to do this because the family was in danger of losing their home and the show's producers were paying their family a large enough amount of money for them to survive. It's hard to tell whether or not Marjorie is telling the truth, and this is left to interpretation by the end of the novel. 

Tensions get increasingly higher, leading up to the climactic exorcism of Marjorie. As Merry tells her story to Rachel, even more secrets are revealed and the lines between fiction/non-fiction, reality and fantasy, begin to blur even further.

Major characters 
Merry Barrett is the narrator and protagonist of the novel. As a child, she has an overactive imagination, and enjoys playing in her room rather than with other kids. She heavily admires her older sister, Marjorie, and would do anything to please her. As an adult, Merry struggles with her infamy she gained in childhood and the mockery she faced following the conclusion of "The Possession". In both adulthood and childhood Merry is an unreliable narrator, openly admitting that she doesn't clearly remember her past and that she lies. 

Marjorie Barrett is Merry's fourteen year old sister. Prior to the start of the novel she begins seeing a therapist regarding her frequent violent outbursts and lack of motivation at school. Prior to these outbursts she is described as a very conscientious and kind sister, however, over time she acts manipulative towards Merry. Despite her age she is incredibly intelligent. After she begins seeing her therapist, her family becomes convinced that she is possessed, and she becomes the focus of a documentary series called "The Possession". 

John Barrett is the father of Merry and Marjorie. Prior to the start of the novel he loses his job, and struggles with the emotions of no longer being the main breadwinner of the family. After turning to the Catholic Church for guidance, he becomes increasingly paranoid and is convinced that Marjorie is not mentally ill, but instead has been possessed. 

Karen Brissette does not appear in the novel directly, but is represented through blog posts that appear at the start of every section of the novel. Her online blog is dedicated to analyzing "The Possession". Karen is often a source of comedic relief, and frequently breaks the fourth wall by drawing parallels to what happens in the documentary show and other pieces of horror fiction, for example The Blair Witch Project.

Background 

While conducting research for another novel, Tremblay stumbled across a series of essays exploring the themes behind William Peter Blatty's novel The Exorcist, one of the most famous fiction novels regarding demonic possession. Noting that while other horror tropes that were popular in the late twentieth century had remerged in popular literature, he wrote A Head Full Of Ghosts in response to the lack of recent novels regarding possession.

Reception 

A Head Full of Ghosts won the Horror Writers Association's Bram Stoker Award for Novel in 2015.

The novel was also praised for being self-referential and comedic without parodying the horror genre. 

The novel was praised by Stephen King, who claimed that it "scared the living hell out of [him]".

Adaptations 

In 2016, Focus Features acquired the rights to develop a movie adaptation. 

In February of 2018, it was announced that Oz Perkins, the director of the horror 2016 film I Am the Pretty Thing That Lives in the House, would be rewriting and directing the film adaptation of A Head Full Of Ghosts.

References

2015 American novels
2010s horror novels
American horror novels
Novels about mental health
Fictional portrayals of schizophrenia
Novels set in Massachusetts
Novels by Paul Tremblay
Bram Stoker Award for Novel winners
HarperCollins books